The following is a list of the FedEx Air & Ground NFL Players of the Week award, sponsored by transportation and delivery company FedEx. Since 2003, following each week of the NFL regular season, six finalists are chosen, based on exemplary individual statistical performances. Three players are nominated for the "Air" award (quarterbacks) and three are nominated for the "Ground" award (running backs). The weekly winners are voted on by fans via an online poll at NFL.com. The "Air" and "Ground" categories are duly named and inspired by FedEx's cargo airline and ground transportation services, FedEx Express and FedEx Ground, respectively.

At the conclusion of the season, three overall finalists are selected for the "Air" and "Ground" players of the year. Once again, fans vote online for the winners of each category.

2003

FedEx Air players of the week

FedEx Ground players of the week

2004

FedEx Air players of the week

FedEx Ground players of the week

2005

FedEx Air players of the week

FedEx Ground players of the week

2006

FedEx Air players of the week

FedEx Ground players of the week

2007

FedEx Air players of the week

FedEx Ground players of the week

2008

FedEx Air players of the week

FedEx Ground players of the week

2009

FedEx Air players of the week

FedEx Ground players of the week

2010

FedEx Air players of the week

FedEx Ground players of the week

2011

FedEx Air players of the week

FedEx Ground players of the week

2012

FedEx Air players of the week

FedEx Ground players of the week

2013

FedEx Air players of the week

FedEx Ground players of the week

2014